William McPherson (March 16, 1933 – March 28, 2017) was an American writer and journalist. He is the author of two novels, Testing the Current and To the Sargasso Sea, and many articles, essays, and book reviews. McPherson was awarded the Pulitzer Prize for Distinguished Criticism in 1977.

Life
William Alexander McPherson was born in Sault Sainte Marie, Michigan, the third son of Harold Agnew McPherson, an executive of Union Carbide Corporation, and of his wife Ruth Brubaker. He lived in Washington, D.C. and New York City for most of his life and spent several years in Romania. He attended the University of Michigan (1951- 1955), Michigan State University (1956-1958) and George Washington University (1960-1962) without taking a degree. In 1959, he married Elizabeth Mosher, with whom he had a daughter, Jane, in 1963. In 1979, McPherson and Mosher divorced.

Career
In 1958, McPherson began his professional career as a copy boy for the Washington Post, becoming a staff writer a few months later. He remained at the Post until 1966, when he became a senior editor at William Morrow & Company in New York. Three years later, at the behest of Ben Bradlee, executive editor of the Washington Post, McPherson returned to the Post, first as daily book editor and then, when the Sunday Book World came under the sole ownership of the Washington Post, as Book World's first editor, a post he held from 1972–1978. He later moved to the editorial page where he wrote a weekly op-ed column, selected the letters to the editor, and was a member of the editorial board. Before and after leaving the Post in 1987, he worked as a freelance writer and journalist, taught writing and criticism at American University in Washington, DC, and lectured at various colleges and universities in the United States and abroad, including Columbia University, the University of Oklahoma, and the Radcliffe Publishing Course.

McPherson's first novel, Testing the Current, was published in 1984 to wide acclaim. Russell Banks wrote in the New York Times Book Review, "William McPherson's first novel is an extraordinarily intelligent, powerful and, I believe, permanent contribution to the literature of family, childhood and memory." The New York Times named Testing the Current one of 1984's "Notable Books of the Year." McPherson's second novel, To the Sargasso Sea, explores the adult life of the first novel's child protagonist. New York Review Books Classics republished Testing the Current in January 2013.

McPherson moved to Romania shortly after the execution of communist dictator Nicolae Ceauşescu and spent most of the next seven years exploring and writing about Romania for Granta, the Wilson Quarterly, the Washington Post, and Slate. McPherson also contributed to The New Republic, The Nation, The New Yorker, the International Herald Tribune, and Life, among other periodicals.

In 2014, McPherson wrote about how he was living in relative poverty, after spending his inheritances and losing money in the stock market.

McPherson died March 28, 2017, at a hospice center in Washington of complications from congestive heart failure and pneumonia.

Selected bibliography
;
 The Best of Granta Reportage (Bill Buford, editor, 1993)
 The Best of Granta'' (Ian Jack, editor, 1998)

Work Online
 "Today in Bucharest," an article in The Washington Post, June 1990
 "The Transylvania Tangle," an essay in The Wilson Quarterly, Winter 1994
 "A Weeklong Electronic Journal," a series in Slate, May 1997
 "A Balkan Comedy," an essay in The Wilson Quarterly, Summer 1997
 "Falling" an essay in The Hedgehog Review, Fall 2014

References

External links
McPherson's blog at Tumblr

1933 births
2017 deaths
People from Sault Ste. Marie, Michigan
American literary critics
20th-century American novelists
American male novelists
Pulitzer Prize for Criticism winners
The Washington Post people
Journalists from Michigan
Novelists from Michigan
University of Michigan alumni
20th-century American male writers
20th-century American non-fiction writers
American male non-fiction writers